Beau Mark Bokan (born November 30, 1981) is an American musician and singer best known as the former lead vocalist of Blessthefall, and the former vocalist of Take the Crown.

Background 
On September 26, 2008, Bokan joined Blessthefall as the vocalist to replace Craig Mabbitt, who left the band due to personal differences and later joined Escape the Fate. He has recorded five studio albums with Blessthefall before their breakup in 2022.

Personal life 

Bokan is of half Mexican descent. He married Canadian electro-pop singer Lights on May 12, 2012. On November 4, 2013, the couple announced that they were expecting their first child. On February 15, 2014, Lights gave birth to a daughter.

Bokan is Roman Catholic. He follows a straight edge lifestyle and has been a vegetarian since 2017.

Discography 

with Take the Crown
 Take the Crown (2006)
 Let the Games Begin (2006)
 Relapse React (2008)

with Blessthefall
 Witness (2009)
 Awakening (2011)
 Hollow Bodies (2013)
 To Those Left Behind (2015)
 Hard Feelings (2018)

Guest appearances

References 

1981 births
Living people
American musicians of Mexican descent
American Roman Catholics
Hispanic and Latino American musicians
21st-century American keyboardists
21st-century American male singers
21st-century American singers